Below is a List of Dames Commander of the Order of the British Empire (Substantive) from the order's creation in 1917 until the present day. Honorary Dames Commander of the Order of the British Empire can be found at :Category:Honorary Dames Commander of the Order of the British Empire.

1910s
1917: The Baroness Byron, The Marchioness of Dufferin and Ava, Sarah Lees, The Marchioness of Londonderry, Edith Balfour Lyttelton, The Baroness Pentland, The Marchioness of Willingdon
1918: Eva Anstruther, Caroline Arnott, The Duchess of Atholl, The Lady Bell of Rounton Grange, Maud Bevan, Maud Burnett, The Marchioness of Bute, Margaret Davidson, The Lady Donner of Oak Mount, Alice Godman, Agnes Jekyll, Adelaide Livingstone, Ethel Locke King, The Baroness Lugard, Nellie Melba, Margaret Pryse-Rice, Clarissa Reid, The Viscountess Ridley, The Countess Roberts, Edith Sclater, Olive Smith-Dorrien, Janet Stancomb-Wills, The Countess Waldegrave, Mary Webster
1919: Rachel Crowdy, The Countess of Darnley, Blanche Gordon-Lennox, Helen Gwynne-Vaughan, The Countess of Harrowby, Henrietta Henderson, Mary Monro, The Baroness Mount Stephen, The Baroness Northcote, Una O'Dwyer, Sarah Oram, Florence Simpson

1920s
1920: Georgiana Buller, Clara Butt, Alice Chisholm, The Countess of Eglinton, The Countess of Gosford, Catherine Hunt, The Countess of Leicester, The Baroness Melchett, Beryl Oliver, Ethel Pearson, Una Pope-Hennessy, The Viscountess Rhondda, Louise Samuel, Ethel Shakespear, The Baroness Talbot of Malahide, Meriel Talbot, Catherine Wingate, Sophia Wintz
1921: Adelaide Anderson, Edith Dixon
1922: The Viscountess Greenwood, Ethel Smyth, Margaret Greville
1923: Belle Cox, Barbara Strickland
1924: Louisa Aldrich-Blake, Henrietta Barnett, The Viscountess Bridgeman, Janet Campbell, Beatrix Lyall
1925: Emma Albani, Mary Cook, Louisa Lumsden, The Baroness St Helier, Anne Smith, Mary Wills, Ellen Terry
1926: Agnes Hunt, Madge Kendal, Maude Lawrence, Jessie Phipps, Mary Scharlieb
1927: Edith Antrobus, The Countess of Cavan, The Countess of Jersey, Emily Penrose, The Countess of Stradbroke, The Viscountess Templewood
1928: The Duchess of Bedford, Frances Dove, Eadith Walker, Elizabeth Wordsworth
1929: Alida Brittain, Harriet Findlay, Gertrude Humphrys, Laura Knight, Anne McIlroy, Bertha Phillpotts

1930s
1930: Mary Bailey
1931: Joanna Cruickshank, Maharani Lakshmi Devi of Dhar, Sarah Mair, Sybil Thorndike
1932: Margaret Tuke, Edith Brown
1933: The Baroness Denman, The Viscountess Simon
1934: Elizabeth Cadbury, Alicia Lloyd Still
1935: Constance D'Arcy, Maria Ogilvie Gordon, Ethel MacDonald, Jean Macnamara, Rosalind Paget, The Duchess of Portland
1936: The Duchess of Abercorn, Regina Evans, The Baroness Gilmour, Christabel Pankhurst
1937: Edith M. Anderson, Geraldine Cadbury, Mary Gilmore, Ellen Pinsent, Juliet Rhys-Williams, The Baroness Strickland, Marie Tempest, Violet Wills
1938: The Countess of Elgin, Florence Lambert, Gwendoline Trubshaw
1939: The Baroness Hillingdon, Ellen Musson

1940s
1941: The Viscountess Craigavon, Myra Hess, The Marchioness of Reading, Reniera Stanley, Irene Vanbrugh
1942: Katharine Jones
1943: Emily Blair, Lilian Braithwaite, Anne Loughlin, Ethel Walker
1944: Lilian Barker, Doris Beale, Jane Trefusis Forbes
1945: Joan Marsham, Vera Laughton Mathews, Katherine Watt
1946: Edith Evans, The Countess of Limerick, The Duchess of Richmond, Mary Welsh, Leslie Whateley
1947: Madeline Brock, Gertrude Cosgrove, Evelyn Fox, Matilda Goodrich, Caroline Haslett, Emmeline Tanner, Eileen Walwyn
1948: The Baroness Sharp, Louisa Wilkinson
1949: Harriette Chick, Myra Curtis, Anne Curwen, Alix Kilroy, Dehra Parker, Felicity Peake, Mary Smieton, Gladys Taylor, Mary Tyrwhitt

1950s
1950: Helen Cargill, Marjorie Cox, Frances Farrer, Adeline Genée, Grace Kimmins, Olive Wheeler, Jocelyn Woollcombe
1951: Ellen Acton, Florence Cardell-Oliver, Mary Daly, Elizabeth Gilmer, Florence Hancock, Hilda Lloyd, Lillian Penson, Anne Thomson, Ninette de Valois
1952: Florence Bevin, Kathleen Courtney, The Viscountess Davidson, Mary Lloyd, Marjorie Maxse
1953: The Baroness Asquith of Yarnbury, Cynthia Colville, Mary Coulshed, Catherine Fulford, Elisabeth Kelly, Flora MacLeod of MacLeod, Enid Russell-Smith
1954: Lilian Bromley-Davenport, Helen Gillespie, Edith Sitwell
1955: Mabel Brookes, Elizabeth Cockayne, The Countess of Rosebery, Nancy Salmon, Irene Ward, Roberta Whyte
1956: The Countess of Albemarle, Peggy Ashcroft, Margot Fonteyn, Kathleen Lonsdale, Mary Railton, Hilda Ross, Lucile Sayers
1957: Anne Bryans, The Countess De La Warr, Annabelle Rankin, Nancy Robertson, Janet Vaughan
1958: Mary Henrietta Barnett, The Baroness Elliot of Harwood, Monica Golding, Mary Latchford Jones, Rose Macaulay, The Duchess of Portland, Maggie Teyte, Alice Mary Williamson
1959: The Viscountess Brookeborough, Ruth Buckley, Mary Colvin, Rebecca West

1960s
1960: Judith Anderson, Alice Berry, The Baroness Brooke of Ystradfellte,  Mary Herring, Elizabeth Hoyer-Millar, Alice Lowrey, Merlyn Myer, Flora Robson
1961: Kitty Anderson, Elizabeth Couchman, The Baroness Hornsby-Smith, Anne Stephens
1962: Anne Godwin, Edith Pitt, Marie Rambert, Jean Roberts, Barbara Salt, Eva Turner
1963: Joyce Bishop, Jean Conan Doyle, Barbara Cozens, Jean Davies, Honor Fell, Alicia Markova, Elisabeth Murdoch
1964: Veronica Ashworth, Jean Rivett-Drake, Margaret Shepherd, The Baroness Vickers, The Baroness Wakehurst, Eileen Younghusband
1965: The Baroness Adrian, Florence Cayford, Mabel Crout, Sibyl Hathaway, Joan Henderson, Barbara Hepworth, Elizabeth Lane, Catherine Scott, Margot Turner
1966: Elsie Abbot, Margaret Drummond, Felicity Hill, Leah Manning, Ngaio Marsh, Anne McEwen, Ruth Railton, Grace Tebbutt, Mabel Tylecote
1967: Margery Corbett Ashby, The Countess of Brecknock, Ivy Compton-Burnett, Gladys Cooper, Helen Gardner, Pauline Giles, Mabel Miller, Beryl Paston Brown, Margaret Rutherford, Ivy Wedgwood, Albertine Winner
1968: Zara Bate, Annis Gillie, Isabel Graham-Bryce, Mary Green, Muriel Powell, Kathleen Raven, Hilda Stevenson, Muriel Stewart, Dorothy Tangney, Veronica Wedgwood, Ethel Wormald
1969: Rita Buxton, Hilda Bynoe, Lady Olwen Carey Evans, Mary Cartwright, Daphne du Maurier, Molly Gibbs, Ella Macknight, Anna Neagle, Sister Mary Regis, Lucy Stuart Sutherland, Elizabeth Yarwood

1970s
1970: Dorothy Ackroyd, Mary Anderson, Te Atairangikaahu, Sara Barker, Bessie Bottomley, Margaret Cole, Marion Kettlewell, Margaret Miles, Peggy van Praagh
1971: Kate Campbell, Agatha Christie, Mabel Coles, Mary Cramer, Adelaide Doughty, Kathleen Ollerenshaw
1972: Nancy Buttfield, Cicely Courtneidge, Diana Reader Harris, Unity Lister, The Baroness Plowden, Freya Stark, Susan Walker
1973: Jill Bolte, Sylvia Crowe, Kathleen Kenyon, Sister Mary Leo, Marjorie Williamson
1974: Josephine Barnes, Emma Clode, The Baroness Denington of Stevenage, Phyllis Frost, Joan Hammond, Rose Heilbron, Albertha Isaacs, The Viscountess Macmillan of Ovenden, Margot Smith
1975: Jacobena Angliss, Helen Blaxland, Bridget D'Oyly Carte, Joyce Daws, Frances Gardner, Wendy Hiller, Margaret Kidd, Ruth Kirk, Vera Lynn, Dorothy Rees, Betty Ridley
1976: Janet Baker, Edith Burnside, Joan Evans, Violet Dickson, Monica Gallagher, Elizabeth Hill, Ada Norris
1977: Geraldine Aves, Moyra Browne, Patricia Mackinnon, Rosemary Murray, Iris Origo, Marjorie Parker, Cecily Pickerill, Winifred Prentice, Frances Yates
1978: Isobel Baillie, Mary Durack, Audrey Reader, Joan Howard Roberts, Sheila Sherlock, Meere Uatioa
1979: Mary Austin, Margaret Booth, Sister Philippa Brazill, The Baroness Butler-Sloss, Elizabeth Coker, Gracie Fields, Judith Hart, Naomi James, Doris Johnson, Daphne Purves, Joan Sutherland, Margaret Weston

1980s
1980: Rachel Cleland, Miriam Dell, Phyllis Friend, Margaret Guilfoyle, Ida Mann, Raigh Roe, Cicely Saunders, The Baroness Soames, Ann Springman
1981: Beryl Beaurepaire, Margaret Blackwood, Mary Bridges, Whina Cooper, Pamela Hunter, Celia Johnson, Ruby Litchfield, Betty Paterson, The Baroness Pike, Shelagh Roberts, Margaret Scott
1982: Doris Fitton, Elisabeth Frink, Catherine Hall, Roma Mitchell, Kiri Te Kanawa, Alice Wedega, Ida Yonge
1983: The Marchioness of Anglesey, Rosamund Holland-Martin, Leonie Kramer, Olga Uvarov
1984: The Baroness Seccombe, Guinevere Tilney, Catherine Tizard, The Baroness Warnock
1985: Jean Herbison, The Baroness Jenkins of Hillhead, The Baroness Knight of Collingtree, Alison Munro, Joan Varley
1986: Vivienne Boyd, Peggy Fenner, Dorothea Horsman, Christian Howard, Gwyneth Jones, Merle Park, Simone Prendergast, Barbara Shenfield, Rosa Tokiel
1987: Elizabeth Chesterton, Marie Clay, Dorothy Fraser, Penelope Jessel, Mary Kekedo, Elizabeth Maconchy, Joan Metge, Iris Murdoch, Sheila Quinn
1988: Barbara Clayton, Judi Dench, Beryl Grey, Rosalinde Hurley, Elaine Kellett-Bowman, Laurie Salas
1989: Silvia Cartwright, The Baroness Dunn, The Baroness Emerton, The Baroness Fookes, Margaret Fry, Barbara Goodman, Rosemary Rue

1990s
1990: Josephine Abaijah, Venetia Blaize, Joyanne Bracewell,  The Baroness Hylton-Foster, The Baroness Lloyd of Highbury, Maggie Smith, Miraka Szászy, Rachel Waterhouse, Dorothy Winstone
1991: Barbara Cartland, Stella Casey, Eugenia Charles, The Baroness Digby, Gwen Ffrangcon-Davies, Jane Gow, Malvina Major, Shirley Porter, Paddy Ridsdale, Lucie Rie, Sue Tinson, Margaret Turner-Warwick
1992: Jocelyn Barrow, Ann Ebsworth, Rangimārie Hetet, Edna Lewis, Moura Lympany, Wendy Mitchell, Shirley Oxenbury, Anne Poole, Norma Restieaux, Angela Rumbold, Elisabeth Schwarzkopf, The Baroness Serota, Janet Smith
1993: Reubina Ballin, Patricia Bergquist, Catherine Cookson, Mary Corsar, Pat Evison, Mary Glen-Haig, Phyllis Guthardt, Louise Henderson, Thora Hird, Dawn Lamb, The Baroness Mance, Anne McLaren, Thea Muldoon, Annette Penhaligon, Margaret Price, Muriel Spark, Heather Steel, Augusta Wallace
1994: Margaret Brain, The Baroness Byford, The Baroness Hale of Richmond, Marea Hartman, Georgina Kirby, Eileen Mayo, Diana Rigg, Gillian Wagner
1995: The Baroness Anelay of St. Johns, Elizabeth Clarke Anson, Josephine Barstow, Marjorie Bean, June Clark, Sister Pauline Engel, Elizabeth Esteve-Coll, Elizabeth Harper, The Baroness Higgins, Mary Hogg, Rose Kekedo, Anne Salmond, The Baroness Thorneycroft
1996: Fiona Caldicott, The 18th Baroness Darcy de Knayth, Jane Drew, The Baroness Fritchie, Felicity Lott, The Baroness Noakes, Antoinette Sibley, Gillian Weir
1997: Rachael Dyche, Deirdre Hine, Cleo Laine, Barbara Mills, Bridget Ogilvie, Joan Sawyer, Rosanna Wong Yick-ming
1998: Gillian Beer, Lorna Boreland-Kelly, Patricia Collarbone, Tamsyn Imison, Betty Kershaw, Helen Metcalf, Gillian Oliver, The Viscountess Runciman of Doxford, Veronica Sutherland, Mary Uprichard
1999: Lady Black of Derwent, Lois Browne-Evans, A. S. Byatt, Diana Collins, Pauline Fielding, Mavis Grant, The Baroness Hallett, Norma Major, Yvonne Moores, Helen Reeves, Margaret Seward, Helena Shovelton, Lesley Southgate, Maureen Thomas

2000s
2000: Julie Andrews, Beryl Bainbridge, Shirley Bassey, Beulah Bewley, Marie Descartes, Vivien Duffield, Anne Evans, Glynne Evans, Geraldine Keegan, Judith Kilpatrick, Jill Macleod Clark, Patricia Morgan-Webb, Lorna Muirhead, Mary Peters, Anne Rafferty, Marlene Robottom, Miriam Rothschild, Steve Shirley, Patricia Symmonds, Elizabeth Taylor, Dorothy Tutin
2001: Ingrid Allen, Eileen Atkins, The Baroness Campbell of Surbiton, Wendy Davies,  Karlene Davis, Jill Ellison, Jean Else, Julia Higgins, Sharon Hollows, Thea King, Sheila McKechnie, Sally Powell, Lesley Rees, Mary Richardson, Dela Smith, Marilyn Strathern, Janet Trotter
2002: Margaret Barbour, Laura Cox, The Baroness Deech, Catherine Elcoat, Judith Mayhew Jonas, Jessica Rawson, Janet Ritterman, Marjorie Scardino, Meg Taylor, Sheila Wallis
2003: Elizabeth Blackadder, Yve Buckland, Pamela Coward, Pauline Green, Louise Johnson, Helen Mirren, Elizabeth Neville, Anna Pauffley, Julia Polak, Ruth Robins, Anita Roddick, Rita Weller, Jenifer Wilson-Barnett
2004: Florence Baron, Enid Bibby, The Baroness Brittan of Spennithorne, Alexandra Burslem, Hilary Cropper, Sandra Dawson, Jacqueline Docherty, Jane Goodall, Elizabeth Gloster, Joan Harbison, The Baroness Harris of Peckham, Patricia Hodgson, Elisabeth Hoodless, Olwen Hufton, Deirdre Hutton, Gillian Morgan, The Baroness Neuberger, The Baroness Olivier of Brighton, Denise Platt, Jane Roberts, Marion Roe, Gail Ronson
2005: Carol M. Black, Maureen Brennan, Linda Dobbs, The Baroness Grey-Thompson, Kelly Holmes, Carol Kidu, Ellen MacArthur, Mary Macdonald, Julia Macur, Sarah Mullally, Gillian Pugh, Nancy Rothwell, Jennifer Smith, Caroline Swift, Jean Thomas, Fanny Waterman
2006: Averil Cameron, Liz Forgan, Anna Hassan, Carole Jordan, Susan Leather, Julie Mellor, Janet Nelson, Daphne Sheldrick, Ruth Silver, Vivienne Westwood
2007: Yasmin Bevan, Jocelyn Bell Burnell, Marcela Contreras, Mary Douglas, Ann Dowling, Evelyn Glennie, Joan Higgins, Janet Husband, Mary Keegan, Barbara Kelly, Emma Kirkby, Ann Leslie, Mary Marsh, Mary Perkins, Josephine Williams
2008: The Baroness Bakewell, Christine Beasley, Hilary Blume, Lynne Brindley, Kay Davies, Margaret Drabble, Janet Finch, Clara Furse, Eleanor King, Donna Kinnair, Monica Mason, The Baroness O'Loan, Judith Parker, Sonia Proudman, Fiona Reynolds, Elizabeth Slade, Barbara Stocking, Mary Tanner, Jacqueline Wilson
2009: Jenny Abramsky, Sally Davies, Elizabeth Fradd, The Baroness Gould of Brookwood, Barbara Hakin, Wendy Hall, Anne Owers, Linda Partridge, Philippa Russell, Rosalind Savill, Victoria Sharp, Joan Stringer, Mitsuko Uchida

2010s
2010: Valerie Beral, Claire Bertschinger, Monica Dacon, Nicola Velfor Davies, Athene Donald, The Baroness Eaton, Amelia Fawcett, Jacqueline Fisher, Janet Gaymer, Julia Goodfellow, Susan Ion, Barbara Monroe, Janet Paraskeva, Paula Rego, Alison Richard, Kathryn Thirlwall, Clare Tickell, Marcia Twelftree, Naila Zaffar
2011: Helen Alexander, Elish Angiolini, Patricia Bacon, Anne Begg, Ruth Carnall, Rosemary Cramp, Antonia Fraser, Susan John, Reena Keeble, Sally Macintyre, Beverley Lang, Jenni Murray, Felicity Palmer, Indira Patel, Anne Rafferty, The Baroness Rees of Ludlow, Janet Suzman, Lucy Theis, The Baroness Wallace of Saltaire, Harriet Walter
2012: Mary Archer, Margaret Makea Karika Ariki, Glynis Breakwell, Moira Gibb, Zaha Hadid, Judith Hill, Tessa Jowell, The Baroness Brown of Cambridge, Tina Lavender, Penelope Lively, Julie Moore, Sylvia Morris, The Baroness Neville-Rolfe, Joan Ruddock, Theresa Sackler, Janet Thornton
2013: Sarah Asplin, Margaret Beckett, Janet Wolfson de Botton, Susan Bourne, Christine Braddock, Sally Coates, Sarah Cowley, Nicky Cullum, Diana Ellis, Nancy Hallett, Helen Hyde, Anne Mandall Johnson, Monica Joseph, Hermione Lee, Joan McVittie, Priscilla Newell, Vicki Paterson, Janice Pereira, Judith Rees, Carol Robinson, Vivien Rose, Dana Ross-Wawrzynski, Phyllis Somers, Sarah Storey, Angela Watkinson
2014: Geraldine Andrews, Kathryn August, Susan Bailey, Kate Barker, Maizie Barker-Welch, Mary Colette Bowe, Rosemary Butler, Alison Carnwath, Sue Carr, Jessica Corner, Laura Davies, Celia Hoyles, Penelope Keith, Asha Khemka, Frances Kirwan, Elisabeth Laing, Angela Lansbury, Gillian Lynne, Louise Makin, Hilary Mantel, Maura McGowan, Nicola Nelson-Taylor, Frances Patterson, Alison Peacock, Shirley Pearce, Erica Pienaar, Dawn Primarolo, Seona Reid, Zandra Rhodes, Jennifer Roberts, Alison Russell, Pamela Shaw, Ingrid Simler, Julia Slingo, Rachel de Souza
2015: Frances Ashcroft, Annette Brooke, Sue Bruce, Victoria Bruce, Frances Cairncross, Bobbie Cheema-Grubb, Joan Collins, Kate Dethridge, Carol Ann Duffy, Oremi Evans, Anne Glover, Pippa Harris, Margaret Hodge, Siobhan Keegan, Fiona Kendrick, Zarine Kharas, Juliet May, Denise McBride, Anne McGuire, Joyce Plotnikoff, Mary Quant, Esther Rantzen, Teresa Rees, Nemat Shafik, Eileen Sills, Kristin Scott Thomas, Dianne Thompson, Marina Warner, Philippa Whipple, Glenis Willmott, Fiona Woolf
2016: Anita Allen, The Baroness Black of Strome, Louise Casey, Denise Coia, Polly Courtice, Caroline Dean, Anna Dominiczak, Lesley Fallowfield, Judith Hackitt, Alice Hudson, Nerys Jefford, Susan Jowett, Rotha Johnston, Frances Lannon, Christine Lenehan, Georgina Mace, Natalie Massenet, Carolyn McCall, Henrietta Moore, Finola O'Farrell, Julia Peyton-Jones, Siân Phillips, Heather Rabbatts, Benita Refson, Caroline Spelman, Glenys Stacey, Arabella Warburton, Margaret Whitehead, Penelope Wilton, Barbara Windsor, Rosie Winterton, Til Wykes
2017: Elizabeth Nneka Anionwu, Vera Baird, Inga Beale, Hilary Boulding, Carmen Callil, Sarah Connolly, Olivia De Havilland, Jessica Ennis-Hill, Amanda Fisher, Helen Fraser, Barbara Frost, Katherine Grainger, Carolyn Hamilton, Jane Jiang, Parveen Kumar, Gwynneth Knowles, Ottoline Leyser, Theresa Marteau, Helena Morrissey, Clare Moulder, Patricia Routledge, Cilla Snowball, Angela Strank, Julie Walters, Caroline Leigh Watkins, June Whitfield, Anna Wintour, Amanda Yip
2018: Mary Beard, Janet Beer, Darcey Bussell, Hilary Chapman, Sara Cockerill, Johannah Cutts, Jane Dacre, Jacqueline Daniel, Louise Ellman, Pratibha Gai, Cheryl Gillan, Moya Greene, Sue Hill, Vivian Hunt, Eleanor Laing, Christina Lambert, Stella Manzie, Clare Marx, Angela McLean, Angela Pedder, Susan I. Rice, Christine Ryan, Frances Saunders, Rosemary Squire, Emma Thompson, Janet Vitmayer, Cathy Warwick
2019: Madeleine Atkins, Glenda Bailey, Janet Bostwick, Elizabeth Corley, Cressida Dick, Jennifer Eady, Carolyn Fairbairn, Sarah Falk, Judith Farbey, Alison Foster, Jacqueline Foster, Uta Frith, Jayne-Anne Gadhia, Ann Gloag, Marianne Griffiths, Frances Judd, Julie Kenny, Sandra Lau, Lesley Lawson, Laura Lee, Nathalie Lieven, Louise Martin, Constance Mitcham, Mary Ney, Alison Nimmo, Ann Louise Robinson, Elan Closs Stephens, Karen Steyn, Justine Thornton, Sara Thornton, Rachel Whiteread

2020s
2020: Caroline Allen, The Baroness Benjamin, Mary Berry, Muffy Calder, The Baroness Campbell of Loughborough, Siobhan Davies, Clare Gerada, Lynn Gladden, Teresa Graham, Gillian Guy, Victoria Heywood, Susan Hill, Elaine Inglesby-Burke, Diana Johnson, Donna Langley, Maureen Lipman, Olivia Newton-John, Magdalene Odundo, Caroline Palmer Yeates, Linda Pollard, Anne Marie Rafferty, Lesley Regan, Rose Tremain, Julia Unwin, Emma Walmsley, Sarah Whatmore, Sharon White, Sarah Worthington
2021: Helen Atkinson, Karin Barber, Phyllida Barlow, Catherine Bingham, Imogen Cooper, Angela Eagle, Uta Frith, Sarah Gilbert, Jane Glover, Rachel Griffith, Sheila Hancock, Meg Hillier, Sandra Horley, Jean Kekedo, Andrea Leadsom, Prue Leith, Sara Llewellin, Irene Lucas-Hays, Caroline MacEwen, Caroline Mason, Pat McGrath, Carol Propper, Arlene Phillips, Maura Regan, Anne Richards, Jo da Silva, Alwen Williams
2022: The Baroness Arbuthnot of Edrom, Kelyn Bacon, Linda Colley, Rowena Collins Rice, Vivienne Cox, Flora Duffy, Naomi Ellenbogen, Arlene Foster, Christine Gilbert, Sue Gray, Clare Grey, Nia Griffith, Jenny Harries, Sylvia Heal, Deborah James, Fionnuala Jay-O'Boyle, Karen Jones, Laura Kenny, Sara Khan, The Baroness Lancaster of Kimbolton, Emily Lawson, Diane Lees, Ann Limb, Joanna Lumley, Julie Lydon, Sally Mapstone, Ruth May, Maria Miller, Fiona Powrie, June Raine, Vanessa Redgrave, Louise Richardson, The Lady Sainsbury of Turville, Joanna Smith, Sarah Springman, Mary Stacey, Helen Stokes-Lampard, Amanda Tipples, Heather Williams
2023: Angela Ahrendts, Dawn Childs, Lyn Chitty, Nicola Dandridge, Sally Dicketts, Anita Frew, Denise Lewis, Julie Maxton, Heather McGregor, Virginia McKenna, Cathryn Nutbrown, Norma Redfearn, Alison Rose, Robina Shah, Tanishi H Joshi

See also
 List of Dames Grand Cross of the Order of the British Empire
 List of Knights Grand Cross of the Order of the British Empire

References

 
Dames Commander of the Order of the British Empire
British Empire